What Did You Expect? may refer to:

 What Did You Expect? (Jackie Martling album), 1979
 What Did You Expect? (Michael Cohen album), 1973
 "What Did You Expect?", a song by Neck Deep from Rain in July
 What Did You Expect? (film), 2012